In enzymology, a N-acetylneuraminate 7-O(or 9-O)-acetyltransferase is an enzyme that catalyzes the chemical reaction

acetyl-CoA + N-acetylneuraminate  CoA + N-acetyl-7-O(or 9-O)-acetylneuraminate

Thus, the two substrates of this enzyme are acetyl-CoA and N-acetylneuraminate, whereas its 3 products are CoA, N-acetyl-7-O-acetylneuraminate, and N-acetyl-9-O-acetylneuraminate.

Nomenclature 

This enzyme belongs to the family of transferases, specifically those acyltransferases transferring groups other than aminoacyl groups.  The systematic name of this enzyme class is acetyl-CoA:N-acetylneuraminate 7-O(or 9-O)-acetyltransferase. Other names in common use include N-acetylneuraminate 7(8)-O-acetyltransferase, sialate O-acetyltransferase, N-acetylneuraminate 7,8-O-acetyltransferase, acetyl-CoA:N-acetylneuraminate-7- or 8-O-acetyltransferase, acetyl-CoA:N-acetylneuraminate-7- and/or 8-O-acetyltransferase, glycoprotein 7(9)-O-acetyltransferase, acetyl-CoA:N-acetylneuraminate-9(7)-O-acetyltransferase, N-acetylneuraminate O7-(or O9-)acetyltransferase, and acetyl-CoA:N-acetylneuraminate-9(or 7)-O-acetyltransferase.

References 

 
 

EC 2.3.1
Enzymes of unknown structure